Yolanda van Heezik is a New Zealand academic and a professor of zoology at the University of Otago. She is considered one of New Zealand's first urban ecologists.

In 1988 van Heezik completed a PhD at the University of Otago in animal biology, writing her thesis on penguin ecology. Her research is focused on birds and other wildlife in urban areas, and biodiversity of gardens. She also researches and writes about children's connections with nature.

Selected works

Book 
Saint Jalme, M., van Heezik, Yolanda, Paillat, P., & Eichaner, X. (2001). Propagation of the houbara bustard
van Heezik, Yolanda, & Freeman, Claire (2018). Children, Nature and Cities: Rethinking the Connections.

Journal articles

References 

Academic staff of the University of Otago
New Zealand zoologists
Living people
University of Otago alumni
Year of birth missing (living people)